The Castellana Caves (Italian: Grotte di Castellana) are a karst cave system located in the municipality of Castellana Grotte, in the Metropolitan City of Bari, Apulia, southern Italy.

Overview

The main cave is named "La Grave" (as abyss), and others are named Black Cavern (Caverna Nera), White Cave (Grotta Bianca) and Precipice Cavern (Caverna del Precipizio).

Description
The Caves of Castellana open in south-eastern Murge, a limestone plateau dating back to the upper Cretaceous (ninety- one hundred million years ago) and rising 330 metres above sea level.
The area of Castellana is characterized by limestone, a sedimentary rock composed largely of calcium carbonate, known as Limestone of Altamura.
The cave system is 3348 metres in length and the point of maximum depth reaches 122 metres. The temperature within the caves is about 18 °C.
The caves are open all year round except for Christmas Day and the New Year's day. The visit develops along two itineraries: the first is 1 km long and lasts about 50 minutes while the second is 3 km long and lasts about two hours. The tour timetable changes depending on the season. In addition, during the summer there are also guided night tours.
The Grave is the first and the biggest cave of this wonderful speleological complex and it is the only one communicating with the outside. It measures 100 m in length, 50 m in width and 60 m in depth. Going beyond the Grave stalactites, stalagmites, curtains and precious crystals continues to embellish everywhere the caves. The name of the environment are the result through the imagination of the early explorers: the She-Wolf, the Monuments, the Owl, the Little Virgin Mary, the Altar, the Precipice, the Desert Corridor, the Reverse Column, the Red Corridor, the Dome up to the last and the most dazzling one, the White Cave.

Peculiarity
Castellana's speleological complex is unique among other cave systems thanks to its three peculiarities: the Grave, the White Cave and the concretions.

The Grave
The Grave of Castellana is a huge natural pantheon thanks to its natural skylight surrounded by a circle of holm-oaks through which a ribbon of clear sky is visible. From the ceiling a big sunbeams filters down into the darkness and it moves differently according to the time of the day and the season. Within the Grave, the sunlight creates magical effects, firstly draws a huge white screen on the descending walls, secondly it gives life to a far stalagmite group, called the Cyclopes because they look like sea giants rising out from the chaos of a stormy sea. Finally it reaches the irregular and dark bottom of the chasm. The southern walls, the big broken curtains and the green moss-grown columns stay always in the darkness. Beyond these columns there is the majestic architectural structures that the nature build up in the darkness by the passing of time.
The Grave is the first huge cave of the cave karst system and the only one communicating with the outside. Its history dates back to ninety-one hundred million years ago in the upper Cretaceous. At that time Apulia was submerged by an old sea where lived large colonies of molluscs and sea vegetables. For millions of years generations of these life forms-plants and marine molluscs succeeded each other and died, so their empty shells and their carcasses were piled up on the seabed, forming a giant deposit of mud and sand, that with a continuous growth was compressed forming limestone layers for a total thickness of several kilometres. Starting since 66 million years ago, the gradual raising of the land brought the region to its current aspect. However, the new emerged land was too rigid and for this reason it was cut in a multitude of fractures. The eluvial water of large rainfall infiltrated into the subsurface soil and rock and created massive groundwater aquifer. The physical and chemical effect of water running underground, dissolved gradually the limestone and enlarged the fractures. Over geological eras cracks expanded to till become galleries and then cavern which became bigger and bigger. In certain cases a large number of cracks intersected and so there were several frequent collapses, while the thickness of the rock, that separated the cave from the outside, was so reduced that the vault fell down. This happened in the Grave of Castellana and thus the first sunbeam could come in the darkness of the cave.

The White Cave
At the end of the underground itinerary and about 1500 metres far from the Grave there is a small portal dig in an imposing alabaster wall. This is the entrance of the last and the most beautiful caves of Castellana, the White Cave.
Suddenly all the wonders of the previous halls disappear compared with the majesty of this corner of heaven. Going on slowly, almost in reverent silence in this underground temple, the astonished visitor is surrounded by the whiteness of alabaster, this is because the cave has been indicated as the most shining cave in the world.
A small but spectacular basin, once full of drip water, is now adorned with crystals, which embellish its bottom and walls. Every corner of the cave is adorned with very white and translucent stalagmites. 
In front of the visitor takes place the final scene: two high and huge columns seem to support the vault of the last hall, embellished everywhere by white stalactites and coral concretions. 
This is the end and the most enchanting moment of the underground tour that remind the visitor of the power and of the gracefulness of the nature.

Concretions and eccentric stalactites
The most fascinating feature of the Caves of Castellana are the concretions. This term is used to indicate the mineral deposits that covered the naked walls of a cave by crystallisation of the calcite carried in solution by infiltrating rain water, that had penetrated all the overhanging layers of the rock by a very slow seepage. 
When the water drips through the roof of an empty cavern, the calcite dissolved in it deposits on the roof and going downwards takes the shape of a stalactite. When the drop of water falls on the floor, the calcite takes the shape of a stalagmite. As time went by, the downwards extension of a stalactite and the progressive growth of the below stalagmite led to the formation of a column.
Besides this elementary forms, there is a great number of other concretions such as calcite flowstones, curtains, (which are due to the flowing of water), corals, calcite crystals, (which formed underwater), cave pearls, formed of concentric layers as calcite crystallizes on a nucleus such as a microscopic grain of rock, and the eccentric concretions, which defy gravity.
As regards eccentric stalactites, they normally have a small size and break the force of gravity. Unlike other stalactites, they grow multidirectionally in capricious ways, i.e. horizontally to the floor, developing weird curved patterns and even upwardly.
They still have no clear origin and even the cave scientists are at variance with the formation of the eccentric stalactites. According to speleology, there are several hypothesis about their origin, but undoubtedly there are several factors for their multidirectional forms.
The first factor is the possible presence of draughts in the caves that would drive horizontally the direction of the drops and therefore the growth of the concretion. The second factor has to do with the particular form in which calcite crystallizes. Calcite is a mineral that crystallizes in the trigonal system and has perfect rhombohedral cleavage. The cannula of a stalactite is formed by a series of very small rhombohedra which interpenetrate each other. If, as consequence of several causes, the cannula is perforated on the side, water will come out through that opening and will create an aggregate of other rhombohedra on the side.
The third one is the presence of any impurities in the water. They can hinder the growth of a calcite rhombohedron in a direction and thus it can form an aggregate on the side that will follow a different direction.

There are also eccentric stalactites whose central cannula is very thin (the diameter is less than one millimetre) and so the water flows very slowly. At the end of this stalactite there is always a droplet whose calcite crystals can align randomly so the formation follows a new direction.

Discovery
In 1938 the Provincial Tourist Board of Bari asked the Italian Institute of Speleology of Postojna for a speleologist to make an inspection in some caves of the area that have been already explored to turn them into a tourist attraction. But none of them, because of their limited extension, was in this way useful.

The 23 January 1938, finally, Anelli climbed down into the Grave, whose bottom was full of a large amount of waste material, accumulated there by the passing of time. He descended to the floor, and then he ventured out to a corridor that disappeared into the darkness and then he found himself in a passage half hidden by stalactites and stalagmites and finally in a huge cave, later called "Cave of the Monuments". This cavern was so huge that his acetylene lamp could not light the vault and the walls and so he decided to come back two days later to continue his exploration.
This time Anelli was helped by a bold worker from Castellana, Vito Matarrese. Together they descended into the cave and continued the exploration for more than 300 metres. But they had to stop at the end of a short descending gallery in front of a deep abyss, today known as the Snake Corridor.

Two months later, in March 1938, Anelli came back to Castellana and, again with Matarrese, continued the exploration. But, once more, he had to stop by reaching a new chasm more than 600 metres far from the first cave.
Professor Anelli spent several days in Castellana and started the first ever survey on the caves, which was completed in September 1938, during his third stay in Castellana.
When Anelli left Castellana, it was Vito Matarrese who was responsible for the exploration of the caves. He climbed over the precipice of the Desert Corridor and discovered the last cave, the White Cave, in 1940.

Fauna
Many animals live in the caves of Castellana and some of them are new endemic species. They are:
Isopods Murgeoniscus anellii and Castellanethes sanfilippoi
Pseudoscorpion Hadoblothrus gigas
Beetles Tychobythinus anelli and Italodytes stammeri
There are also a large number of Troglophilus andreinii cave crickets.

The most typical animal of the cave is the bat, the only mammals capable of true flight. In the caves of Castellana there are five species of small bats. They are: Miniopterus schreibersii, Rhinolophus ferrumequinum, Rhinolophus mehelyi, Rhinolophus euryale and Myotis capaccinii.

Legends 
The entrance of the Grave, that is to say the deep chasm, had always struck terror into the people going along the nearby country street, above all at twilight. It could have happened that the superstitious wayfarers saw, together with the bats flying out of the cave chasm to eat insects in the fields of the area, strange vapours that they thought were the souls of the suicides who had threw themselves down the Grave, and were trying to go to heaven in vain but Satan was holding them down because suicides are a sin and you will go to hell.
Vincenzo Longo (1737–1825), humanist and expert on law from Castellana, probably was the first man who descended in the Grave together with a big group of young people. The memories of the courageous achievement, enriched by new several details, was preserved by its witnesses and then it was handed down to posterity.
In the 19th century the Chorographical-Universal Dictionary of Italy vouched for the truth of the achievement: A little more than a mile far from Castellana there is a natural sight, a chasm called the Grave by common people. Its entrance is an hole about 180 spans in circumference and about 300 spans in depth. In the previous century some brave inhabitants of Castellana descend into the Grave early in the morning. They used ropes and hawsers and went along dark corridors for several miles. After 24 hours, while their relatives and friends were very worrying about the long wait, they came back to surface.

Speleological museum "Franco Anelli"
The speleological museum of the Caves of Castellana, "Franco Anelli", was inaugurated on 23 January 2000, on the occasion of the 62nd anniversary of the discovery of the caves. It is dedicated to Professor Franco Anelli (1899–1977), born in Lodi, who was speleologist, discover, populariser as well as passionate director of the Caves of Castellana. The museum is managed by Gruppo Puglia Grotte, the speleological association of Castellana founded in 1971, on behalf of Grotte di Castellana Company. According to Anelli the visit at the Speleological Museum would have been an "easy delightful excursion over the pages of a fascinating book, the book of the caves: few orderly chapters to provide a commentary for a ponderous volume, that of the Science of caves". This is the aim of the museum. 
The museum is located in the a building planned in 1952 by the architect Pietro Favia (1895–1972). It allow the tourist to delve into science and speleology and also represent a reference point for the speleological research in Apulia. It houses the Centre of Speleological Documentation of the Apulian Speleological Federation "Franco Orofino" that includes a speleological library, a newspaper and periodical library and an archive of photographs.

Educational workshops
Since several years the speleological museum "Franco Anelli" is the destination of an increasing didactic tourism thanks to guided tours, educational workshops, and speleological tours in the secondary forks of the caves for pupils and students. It represent one of the most important innovation of Castellana's speleological complex. 
The educational workshops cover astronomy, science of caves, speleology, bio-speleology, geology and ecology. They share Professor Anelli's idea to spread among school students "the knowledge about the underground world and the scientific studies related to it through lively visual illustration of the subsurface and the physical, biological and anthropic phenomena which take place in the underground or which took place thousands of years ago at the time of the geological history of Italy".
Moreover, in the museum are offered cultural activities, with the aim to promote education and learning by means of interactive workshops and specific lessons holding directly inside the caves. One of these cultural activities is speleojunior that gives students the opportunity to feel the emotion of the darkness and to learn the most secret features of the caves.

Historical events
Among the most famous visitors of the caves in the period of their launching as tourist attraction there were Luigi Einaudi (1874–1961), Aldo Moro (1916–1978), Enrico Mattei (1906–1962), Gina Lollobrigida, Silvana Pampanini, Margareth aus England (1930–2002) and Tito Schipa (1888–1965).
Similarly, several film producers were fascinated by the caves and eight films were shot in the caves. They are: The Age of the Love (1953) by Michael Hamilton (but he is Lionello De Felice), Hercules in the Haunted World (1961) by Mario Bava and Franco Prosperi, Maciste in Hell (1962) by Riccardo Freda; Casanova 70 (1965) by Mario Monicelli, The King of Criminals (1968) by Paul Maxwell (but he is Paolo Bianchini); Stellar Clashes beyond the Third Dimension (1978) by Lewis Coates (but he is Luigi Cozzi); Alien 2: On Earth (1980) by Sam Cromwell (but he is Ciro Ippolito) and Biagio Proietti and an episode of the TV series Holiday Profession (1986) by Vittorio De Sisti. Additionally, two films by Antonio Leonviola shot here: TAUR IL RE DELLA FORZA BRUTA (1963), and its sequel LE GLADIATRICI (1963). The English version of the former (TOR, MIGHTY WARRIOR) carries an end credit which says "The producers wish to express their gratitude to the Yugoslave (sic) authorities for granting permission to shoot some scenes in the grottoes of Postumia".
The underworld scenes of ARRIVANO I TITANI by Duccio Tessari also seem to have been filmed here.

Bibliography
Anelli Franco, Castellana – Arcano mondo sotterraneo in Terra di Bari. Nuova Postumia d’Italia, Castellana Grotte, 1954.
Carpinelli Gaetano Sergio, Speleonight, speleologia e divulgazione attraverso escursioni turistico-emozionali nelle Grotte di Castellana. Studio statistico pilota, Gruppo Puglia Grotte, Spelaion 2011.
Lovece Daniela, Pace Pino, Il cinema alle Grotte di Castellana (Castellana-Grotte, Puglia), in Grotte e dintorni, 11, 2006.
Lovece Daniela, Pace Pino, Le prime immagini delle Grotte di Castellana, in Grotte e dintorni, 14, 2007.
Manghisi Vincenzo, Le Grotte di Castellana. Cinquant’anni di storia e d’immagine, Nuova Editrice Apulia, 1990.
Manghisi Vincenzo, Franco Anelli (1899–1977) – Un maestro di speleologia e di vita, in Grotte e dintorni, 1, Castellana-Grotte, 2001.
Manghisi Vincenzo, Pace Pino, Guida illustrata alle Grotte di Castellana, Castellana-Grotte, 2006.
Manghisi Vincenzo, Pace Pino, La Grave di Castellana-Grotte tra storia e leggenda, Martina Franca, 2009.
Pace Pino, La vocazione didattica del Museo Speleologico Franco Anelli, Gruppo Puglia Grotte, Spelaion 2011.
Regione Puglia, Federazione Speleologica Pugliese, Grotte e carsismo in Puglia, Castellana-Grotte, 2007.
Reina Alessandro, Parise Mario, Geologia delle Grotte di Castellana: ipotesi speleogenetiche. In Geologi e Territorio, 1, 2004

Gallery

See also
List of caves
List of caves in Italy

References

External links

 Grotte di Castellana official site

Show caves in Italy
Landforms of Apulia
Karst caves
Metropolitan City of Bari
Tourist attractions in Apulia
Caves of Italy